
Year 176 BC was a year of the pre-Julian Roman calendar. At the time it was known as the Year of the Consulship of Hispallus/Laevinus and Spurinus (or, less frequently, year 578 Ab urbe condita). The denomination 176 BC for this year has been used since the early medieval period, when the Anno Domini calendar era became the prevalent method in Europe for naming years.

Events 
 By place 
 Roman Republic 
 The Roman general, Tiberius Sempronius Gracchus, subdues Sardinia, enslaving some of the population.

 Egypt 
 Cleopatra I Syra dies leaving her son, Ptolemy VI, to rule Egypt alone.

 Parthia 
 King Phriapatius of Parthia dies and is succeeded by his son Phraates I.

Births

Deaths 
 Cleopatra I Syra, queen of Egypt from 193 BC, wife of Ptolemy V Epiphanes and regent for her young son, Ptolemy VI Philometor (b. c. 204 BC)
 Phriapatius, king of Parthia

References